= Munira Yaqubova =

Tajikistani pediatrician

- Born: July 1, 1932 (age 94); Bukhara, Uzbek SSR, Soviet Union
- Education: Tajikistan State Medical Institute
- Occupations: Pediatrician, professor
- Medical career
- Field: Pediatrics, nephrology
- Awards: Order of the Red Banner of Labour

Munira Yaqubova (born July 1, 1932) was a Tajikistani pediatrician.

Born in Bukhara, Yaqubova was the daughter of Mukhsin Yaqubov and his wife Mohira, a couple who were heavily involved in the pharmaceutical industry. She graduated from the Tajikistan State Medical Institute in 1956, continuing her studies in the children's wards of the same institution. From 1958 to 1963 she served first as associate director and later as director of the Dushanbe Children's Hospital No. 2. She became head of the Department of Pediatrics of the Medical Institute in 1963. In 1972 she became both a doctor and a professor. She published and edited a number of journals during her career, including Tandurusti (Health) and Pediatria (Pediatrics). Her publications include Osnovnie Kliniko-rentgenologicheskie metodi diagnostiki kholetsistitov u detei, (Diagnosis and Treatment of Kidney Disease in Children, Dushanbe, 1966); nephrology long remained an area of particular interest to her in her research. Heavily active in the development of pediatrics as a discipline in Tajikistan, she received numerous awards and decorations during her career, including the Order of the Red Banner of Labour.
